Phil Campos was a singer who recorded a couple of albums and singles during the 1960s. He was a member of folk groups, Les Baxter's Balladeers in the early 1960s and later the group leader of The Forum which had a hit in the late 1960s. He was also an actor who appeared in some well-known television shows.

Career
In the early 1960s, Campos was a member of Les Baxter's Balladeers and was with the group when they recorded their 1961 self-titled album, released on the Reprise label.

His single "Street Fight" / "Rebel Rider" was released in 1960 on the Impact label. "Street Fight" would later appear on the Sin Alley! volume 4 various artists comp which was released on Sleaze Records.

While with Les Baxter's Balladeers Campos, with his baritone voice, attracted attention. The Reno Gazette-Journal noted his handling of "Sinner Man" and him singing the solo parts of "Asheville Junction".

By August 1963, Campos & Paul Hansen had recorded an album, which was released on the Crown label.

Reporting on the Hootenanny '63 event at Carnegie Hall, Billboard's Lee Zhito wrote in the September 7 issue of the magazine that Campos with his key sense humor and dramatic projection covering the song "Street Fight" and the effect it had on the audience was the most outstanding of the new face acts.
In a review of the 1963 various artists album Hootenanny At The Troubadour, Campos who covered the song "Captain Kidd", was singled out by the Billboard reviewer as a real talent find. 
In 1964, Campos appeared in an episode of The Folk World of Jimmie Rodgers.

In 1966, Campos had formed the group, The Forum which was consisted of him and 2 females. The other 2 members were Rene Nole (whom he would later marry) and a teenage girl  Riselle Bain. In 1967, the group had a hit with "The River Is Wide". They also released an album of the same name with half of the songs penned by Les Baxter. 
In December 1968 Campos was in Nevada, appearing at the Carson City Nugget, billed as Phil Campos & the Forum. After the group folded, Campos and his wife formed a duo. Around April 1969, Campos and the Forum were appearing at the Theatre Lounge of the Carson City Nugget every night except Sundays. Campos also had another role as the show's MC. His covering of songs such as "He's Got The Whole World In His Hands" and "Sailor Man, Where You Gonna Run To?" had a definite impact on the audience.

In September 1970, along with Rene Noel and the Four Tunes, Campos began a month long engagement at the Mint Hotel in Las Vegas.

Acting and television
Ads an actor, Campos had a few roles in television shows such as Dragnet, Wagon Train and Badge 14.

Death
Campos died in July 1987.

Discography

References

External links
 Website
 Campos & Nole at The Petroleum Club (1970's)

1934 births
1987 deaths
20th-century American singers
American folk singers
American folk-pop singers
American male pop singers
Singers from New York (state)
American folk guitarists
American pop guitarists
20th-century American musicians
20th-century American male actors
Male actors from New York (state)
20th-century American guitarists
20th-century American male singers
Les Baxter's Balladeers members
Impact Records (California) artists
Crown Records artists